Tobias Campbell may refer to:

Tobias Campbell, musician in On My Honor (band)
Tobias Campbell, actor in Bitter Feast
Tobias Campbell, character in Z Nation